Arizona Colt, also known as The Man from Nowhere, is a 1966 technicolor Spaghetti Western directed by Michele Lupo and starring Giuliano Gemma, Fernando Sancho, Corinne Marchand.

Synopsis
Looking to reinforce his gang Torrez Gordon Watch (Fernando Sancho) raids a jail at the Mexican border. All prisoners who refuse to become his new henchman are to be shot dead. Arizona Colt (Giuliano Gemma) eludes him, and makes it to a peaceful little town which named Blackstone Hill. Little does he know that Gordon plans to rob the bank. Watch has already brought a gang member in position to feel out how it can be done.

While the spy Clay (Giovanni Pazzafini) prepares the robbery, he hits on a young local woman named Dolores (Rosalba Neri). When she recognises him as a member of the very gang, he murders her. Following this crime the bank gets robbed. The father of Dolores recognises among the gangsters the murderer and hires Arizona Colt to bring the gangster to justice.

Technicality
Filming locations by Almería and Cinecittà about summer 1965.

Production
 Art direction and costume design : Walter Patriarca
 Makeup department : Franco Di Girolamo (make-up), Marcella Favella (hair)
 Production management : Paolo Gargano, Piero Lazzari
 Assistant director : Roberto Pariante, Valere Tantini
 Sound department : Italo Cameracanna, Lewis E. Ciannelli, Umberto Picistrelli
 Music department : Raul Lovecchio
 Stunts : Miguel Pedregosa, Nazzareno Zamperla
 Camera and electrical department : Sergio D'Offizi, Giuseppe Lanci, Remo Orienti, Angelo Pennoni, Cesare Saronti
 Additional crew : Franco Rossi, N. W. Russo, Manlio Busoni, Roberto Chevalier, Maria Pia Di Meo, Lauro Gazzolo, Gianni Solaro, Igino Lardani, Pino Locchi, Luigi Pavese, Bruno Persa, Carlo Romano, Rita Savagnone, Sergio Tedesco

Soundtrack
The Arizonal Colt or Il pistolero di Arizona (Francesco De Masi feat Raoul) is an original motion picture soundtrack : "He came out of nowhere, with no one beside him. He rode out of the sunrise all alone. A man out of nowhere, with no one to love him. His one faithful companion was his gun. No one could say, just where he came from. No one could say, where he was going. Was he a man without a heart, a man with a heart made of stone...".

Cast

 Giuliano Gemma as Arizona Colt
 Fernando Sancho as Torrez Gordon Watch
 Corinne Marchand as Jane
 Giovanni Pazzafini as Clay
 Andrea Bosic as Pedro
 Roberto Camardiel as Whiskey
 Mirko Ellis as Sheriff
 Gérard Lartigau as Jack/John
 Rosalba Neri as Dolores
 Pietro Tordi as Priest
 José Manuel Martín as Watch henchman
 Gianni Solaro as Banker
 Valentino Macchi
 Renato Chiantoni as Undertaker
 Tom Felleghy as Will
 Emma Baron
 Otto Rock as Rancher
 Álvaro de Luna as watch henchman
 Piero Morgia
 José Orjas
 Riccardo Pizzuti as watch henchman
 Guglielmo Spoletini as watch henchman
 Elio Angelucci as a townsman
 Bruno Ariè as bandit
 John Bartha as the soldier playing cards with two comrades at stagecoach station
 Jeff Cameron as rancher
 Omero Capanna as bandit
 Alberigo Donadeo as man in saloon
 Pietro Martellanza as rancher
 Gaetano Scala as watch henchman
 José Terrón as watch henchman

Releases
Arizona Colt was released in Italy on 27 August 1966 in Italy and in France on 17 February 1971.

See also
 Arizona Colt Returns

References

 
 Arizona Colt (1966) | BFI
 Arizona Colt de Michele Lupo (1966) - UniFrance

1966 films
1966 Western (genre) films
French Western (genre) films
Spaghetti Western films
1960s Spanish-language films
Films directed by Michele Lupo
Films scored by Francesco De Masi
Films with screenplays by Ernesto Gastaldi
Films shot in Almería
Revisionist Western (genre) films
1960s Italian films
1960s French films
Foreign films set in the United States